is a feature of the Japanese language that distinguishes words by accenting particular morae in most Japanese dialects. The nature and location of the accent for a given word may vary between dialects.

Standard Japanese
Normative pitch accent, essentially the pitch accent of the Tokyo Yamanote dialect, is considered essential in jobs such as broadcasting. The current standards for pitch accent are presented in special accent dictionaries for native speakers such as the Shin Meikai Nihongo Akusento Jiten and the NHK Nihongo Hatsuon Akusento Jiten. Newsreaders and other speech professionals are required to follow these standards.

Foreign learners of Japanese are often not taught to pronounce the pitch accent, though it is included in some noted texts, such as Japanese: The Spoken Language. Incorrect pitch accent is a strong characteristic of a "foreign accent" in Japanese.

Scalar pitch
In standard Japanese, pitch accent has the following effect on words spoken in isolation:
 If the accent is on the first mora, then the pitch starts high, drops suddenly on the second mora, then levels out. The pitch may fall across both morae, or mostly on one or the other (depending on the sequence of sounds)—that is, the first mora may end with a high falling pitch, or the second may begin with a (low) falling pitch, but the first mora will be considered accented regardless. The Japanese describe this as  atamadaka (literally, "head-high").
 If the accent is on a mora other than the first or the last, then the pitch has an initial rise from a low starting point, reaches a near-maximum at the accented mora, then drops suddenly on any following morae. This accent is referred to as  nakadaka ("middle-high").
 If the word has an accent on the last mora, the pitch rises from a low start up to a high pitch on the last mora. Words with this accent are indistinguishable from accentless words unless followed by a particle such as  ga or  ni, on which the pitch drops. In Japanese this accent is called  odaka ("tail-high").
 If the word does not have an accent, the pitch rises from a low starting point on the first mora or two, and then levels out in the middle of the speaker's range, without ever reaching the high tone of an accented mora. In Japanese this accent is named "flat" ( heiban).

Note that accent rules apply to phonological words, which include any following particles. So the sequence "hashi" spoken in isolation can be accented in two ways, either háshi (accent on the first syllable, meaning 'chopsticks') or hashí (flat or accent on the second syllable, meaning either 'edge' or 'bridge'), while "hashi" plus the subject-marker "ga" can be accented on the first syllable or the second, or be flat/accentless: háshiga 'chopsticks', hashíga 'bridge', or hashiga 'edge'.

In poetry, a word such as  omoshirói, which has the accent on the fourth mora ro, is pronounced in five beats (morae). When initial in the phrase (and therefore starting out with a low pitch), the pitch typically rises on the o, levels out at mid range on the moshi, peaks on the ro, and then drops suddenly on the i, producing a falling tone on the roi.

In all cases but final accent, there is a general declination (gradual decline) of pitch across the phrase. This, and the initial rise, are part of the prosody of the phrase, not lexical accent, and are larger in scope than the phonological word. That is, within the overall pitch-contour of the phrase there may be more than one phonological word, and thus potentially more than one accent.

Accent nuclei, defective morae and compound-induced accent shifts
An "accent nucleus" (アクセント核 akusento kaku) or "accent locus" is another name for an accented mora, a mora that carries a high tone and is followed by a mora with a low tone. In other words, the precipitous drop in pitch occurs right at the boundary between the accent nucleus and the mora immediately after it. Unaccented words (of the heiban type) do not have an accent nucleus.

Unlike regular morae or 自立拍 (jiritsu haku "autonomous beats"), defective morae or 特殊拍 (tokushu haku "special beats") cannot generally be accent nuclei. They historically arose through various processes that limited their occurrences and prominence in terms of accent-carrying capability. There are four types of them:
The 撥音 (hatsuon "moraic nasal", /N/, written in kana as ん or ン): derived from Middle Chinese coda consonants (/n/ and /m/) (eg: /kaN/; /wemu/ > /eN/), but also arose naturally through onbin (eg: /yomite/ > /yoNde/)
The 促音 (sokuon "moraic obstruent", /Q/, written in kana as っ or ッ): mainly arose through onbin (eg: /katite/ > /kaQte/) or through consonant assimilation (eg: /setpuku/ > /seQpuku/)
The lengthening half of a long vowel (/R/, written in kana as あ/ア, い/イ, う/ウ, え/エ, お/オ or ー): arose through consonant losses (eg: /kakasaN/ > /kaːsaN/), vowel shifts or vowel assimilation during Late Middle Japanese (eg: /eu/ > /joR/; /joũ/ > /joR/)
The morphologically bound /i/ (/I/, written in kana as い/イ): derived from a Middle Chinese offglide (eg: /taI/; /tuI/) or arose through onbin (eg: /kakisiro/ > /kaIsiro/)

While the accent patterns of single words are often unpredictable, those of compounds are often rule-based. Take the suffix 市 (-shi), for example. When compounding with a place name to form a city name, the accent nucleus of the resulting compound is usually immediately before 市 itself:
千葉 (Chiba): H-L > 千葉市 (Chiba-shi "Chiba City"): L-HꜜL /tibaꜜsi/
But if the mora before 市 is defective, the accent must shift one mora backward:
白山 (Hakusan): H-L-L-L > 白山市 (Hakusan-shi "Hakusan City"): L-H-HꜜL-L /hakusaꜜNsi/
西条 (Saijō): H-L-L-L > 西条市 (Saijō-shi "Sendai City"): L-H-HꜜL-L /saIzjoꜜRsi/
仙台 (Sendai): H-L-L-L > 仙台市 (Sendai-shi "Sendai City"): H-H-HꜜL-L /seNdaꜜIsi/

A defective mora can be an accent nucleus only if the mora following it is also defective:
ロンドンっ子 (Rondon-kko "Londoner"): H-H-H-HꜜL-L /roNdoNꜜQko/
東京っ子 (Tōkyō-kko "Tokyoite"): H-H-H-HꜜL-L /toRkjoRꜜQko/
現代っ子 (gendai-kko "modern person"): H-H-H-HꜜL-L /ɡeNdaIꜜQko/

Compoundified compound nouns vs noncompoundified compound nouns
In general, Japanese utterances can be syntactically split into discrete phrases. For example, the utterance 母が料理をして父が皿を洗います (Haha-ga ryōri-o shite chichi-ga sara-o arai-masu "My mother cooks and my father washes the dishes") can be subdivided into the following phrases:
母が (haha-ga)
料理を (ryōri-o)
して (shite)
父が (chichi-ga)
皿を (sara-o)
洗います (arai-masu)
The general structure of these phrases is that a syntactically free morpheme is followed by one or more syntactically bound morphemes. Free morphemes are nouns, adjectives and verbs, while bound morphemes are particles and auxiliaries. In the above utterance, the free morphemes are 母, 料理, して, 父, 皿, and 洗い while the bound ones are が, を and ます. The accent pattern of the entire utterance could be something like this:

Ideally, each phrase can carry at most one accent nucleus (in the above example, ha-ha-ga, ryo-o-ri-o, chi-chi-ga and a-rai-ma-su), and such accent nucleus is based solely on the lexical accent nucleus of the free morpheme of that phrase (bound morphemes do not have lexical accent patterns, and whatever accent patterns they do have is dependent on those of the free morphemes they follow). However, the situation becomes complicated when it comes to compound nouns.

When multiple independent nouns are placed successively, they syntactically form a compound noun. For example:
第 (dai) + 一次 (ichiji) + 世界 (sekai) + 大戦 (taisen) > 第一次世界大戦 (Dai-ichiji-Sekai-Taisen "World War I")
At the phrasal level, compound nouns are well contained within a phrase, no matter how long they are. Thus, the utterance ヨーロッパは第一次世界大戦では主戦場となった (Yōroppa-wa Dai-ichiji-Sekai-Taisen-de-wa shusenjō-to natta "Europe was the main theater of war in World War I") is subdivided into phrases as follows:
ヨーロッパは (Yōroppa-wa)
第一次世界大戦では (Dai-ichiji-Sekai-Taisen-de-wa)
主戦場と (shusenjō-to)
なった (natta)
As Dai-ichiji-Sekai-Taisen-de-wa is an entire a phrase in itself, it should ideally carry at most one accent nucleus, the lexical accent nucleus of the free compound noun Dai-ichiji-Sekai-Taisen. In actuality, Dai-ichiji-Sekai-Taisen, as a compound noun, is capable of carrying more than one accent nucleus. While still being a syntactic compound, its components might not be solidly "fused" together and still retain their own lexical accent nuclei. Whether Dai-ichiji-Sekai-Taisen should have one nucleus of its own, or several nuclei of its constituents, is a matter of whether it is a "compoundified compound noun" (複合語化複合名詞 fukugōka fukugō meishi) or "noncompoundified compound noun" (非複合語化複合名詞 hifukugōka fukugō meishi). The "compoundification" status of a compound noun is lexical, meaning that whether such compound noun is long or short, or simple or complex, is not relevant to whether it is "compoundified" or not. A yojijukugo such as 世代交代 (sedai-kōtai "change of generation") may be treated as "compoundified," with a single accent nucleus:

Meanwhile, a different four-kanji compound noun, 新旧交代 (shinkyū-kōtai "transition between the old and the new"), is treated as "noncompoundified", and retains the lexical accent nuclei of its constituents (in this case 新旧 and 交代):

Some compound nouns, such as 核廃棄物 (kaku-haikibutsu "nuclear waste"), can be, on a preference basis, either "compoundified" or "noncompoundified":

For "noncompoundified" compound nouns, which constituents should be allowed for may also vary. For example, the above 第一次世界大戦:

Binary pitch
The foregoing describes the actual pitch. In most guides, however, accent is presented with a two-pitch-level model. In this representation, each mora is either high (H) or low (L) in pitch, with the shift from high to low of an accented mora transcribed HꜜL. 
 If the accent is on the first mora, then the first syllable is high-pitched and the others are low: HꜜL, HꜜL-L, HꜜL-L-L, HꜜL-L-L-L, etc.
 If the accent is on a mora other than the first, then the first mora is low, the following morae up to and including the accented one are high, and the rest are low: L-Hꜜ, L-HꜜL, L-H-HꜜL, L-H-H-HꜜL, etc.
 If the word is heiban (accentless), the first mora is low and the others are high: L-H, L-H-H, L-H-H-H, L-H-H-H-H, etc. This high pitch spreads to unaccented grammatical particles that attach to the end of the word, whereas these would have a low pitch when attached to an accented word (including one accented on the final mora).

Phonetically, although only the terms "high" and "low" are used, the "high" of an unaccented mora is not as high as an accented mora. Different analyses may treat final-accented (odaka) words and unaccented (heiban) words as identical and only distinguishable by a following particle, or phonetically contrastive and potentially phonemic based on how high a "high" tone actually is (see the Tertiary pitch subsection below). And the phonetic tones are never truly stable, but degrade toward the end of an utterance. This is especially noticeable in longer words, where the so-called "high" pitch tapers off toward the end. This tapering is especially exemplified by what is variously known as downstep or downdrift, where the "high" pitch of words becomes successively lower after each accented mora:

In slow and deliberate enunciation (for example, with a pause between elements), the "high" tone of the second element in these phrases could still be sufficiently "high," but in natural, often pauseless, speech, it could become as low as the "low" tone of the first element, since there is an accented mora in that first element.

Tertiary pitch
Earlier phonologists made use of a three-tone system, with an additional "mid" tone (M). For example, 端 (hashi "edge", heiban/unaccented) is considered to have a L-M pattern, while 橋 (hashi "bridge", odaka/final-accented) is to have a L-H pattern. This contrast is supported by phonetic analyses, which show that the contrast in frequency between the "low" and "high" tones in, for example, 花 (hana "flower", odaka/final-accented), is much starker than the contrast between the "low" and "mid" tones in 鼻 (hana "nose", heiban/unaccented). Moreover, the "high" tone in final-accented words is phonetically higher than the "mid" tone in unaccented words. With respect to potential minimal pairs such as "edge" hashi vs "bridge" hashi and "nose" hana vs "flower" hana, the "mid" tone, in theory, should be considered phonemic, but it is now largely merged with the "high" tone as phonologists claim there are no perceptible differences in pitch pattern between a final-accented word (odaka) without a following particle and an unaccented word (heiban):

The "mid" tone also corresponds to what is now considered the "low" tone in initial-accented (atamadaka) and medial-accented (nakadaka) words:

Initial lowering
The tone of the first mora in non-initial-accented (non-atamadaka) words is often underspecified. Early versions of the NHK日本語発音アクセント新辞典 (NHK Nihongo Hatsuon Accent Jiten "NHK Pronouncing Accent Dictionary") always leave it unmarked. This is owing to how what is known as "initial lowering" is not universally applied in natural speech, thus making the tone of the first mora indefinite and dependent on the nature of the second mora:
(1) If the second mora is a hatsuon or the lengthening half of a long vowel, the tone of the first mora is "high", and there is no initial lowering
(2) If the second mora is a sokuon, the tone of the first mora is "low", and there is initial lowering, but the tone of the second mora is also "low"
(3) If the second mora is any other type of mora, the tone of the first mora is "low", and there is initial lowering
In the (1) circumstances where initial lowering does not naturally happen in connected speech, it can still be artificially induced with the slow, deliberate enunciation of whatever word is of concern.

The following are illustrative examples of the indefinite pitch of the first mora. For monomoraic non-initial-accented words, the second mora is whatever particle that follows it.

Downstep
Many linguists analyse Japanese pitch accent somewhat differently. In their view, a word either has a downstep or does not. If it does, the pitch drops between the accented mora and the subsequent one; if it does not have a downstep, the pitch remains more or less constant throughout the length of the word: That is, the pitch is "flat" as Japanese speakers describe it. The initial rise in the pitch of the word, and the gradual rise and fall of pitch across a word, arise not from lexical accent, but rather from prosody, which is added to the word by its context: If the first word in a phrase does not have an accent on the first mora, then it starts with a low pitch, which then rises to high over subsequent morae. This phrasal prosody is applied to individual words only when they are spoken in isolation. Within a phrase, each downstep triggers another drop in pitch, and this accounts for a gradual drop in pitch throughout the phrase. This drop is called terracing. The next phrase thus starts off near the low end of the speaker's pitch range and needs to reset to high before the next downstep can occur.

Examples of words that differ only in pitch

In standard Japanese, about 47% of words are unaccented and around 26% are accented on the ante-penultimate mora. However, this distribution is highly variable between word categories. For example, 70% of native nouns are unaccented, while only 50% of kango and only 7% of loanwords are unaccented. In general, most 1–2 mora words are accented on the first mora, 3–4 mora words are unaccented, and words of greater length are almost always accented on one of the last five morae.

The following chart gives some examples of minimal pairs of Japanese words whose only differentiating feature is pitch accent. Phonemic pitch accent is indicated with the phonetic symbol for downstep, .

{| class="wikitable"
!Romanization
!colspan=3|Accent on first mora
!colspan=3|Accent on second mora
!colspan=3|Accentless
|-
|hashi はし
| háshì||||chopsticks
| hàshí||||bridge
| hàshí||||edge
|-
|hashi-ni はしに
| háshì-nì||||at the chopsticks
| hàshí-nì||||at the bridge
|  hàshi-ni||||at the edge
|-
|ima いま
| ímà||||now
| ìmá||||living room
|colspan=3|
|-
|kaki かき
| kákì||||oyster
| kàkí||||fence
| kàkí||||persimmon
|-
|kaki-ni かきに
| kákì-nì||||at the oyster
| kàkí-nì||||at the fence
| kàki-ni||||at the persimmon
|-
|sake さけ
| sákè||||salmon
|colspan=3|
| sàké||||alcohol, sake
|-
|nihon にほん
| níhòn||||two sticks of
| nìhón||||Japan
|colspan=3|
|}

In isolation, the words hashi はし  hàshí "bridge" and hashi  hàshí "edge" are pronounced identically, starting low and rising to a high pitch. However, the difference becomes clear in context. With the simple addition of the particle ni "at", for example,  hàshí-nì "at the bridge" acquires a marked drop in pitch, while  hàshi-ni "at the edge" does not. However, because the downstep occurs after the first mora of the accented syllable, a word with a final long accented syllable would contrast all three patterns even in isolation: an accentless word nihon, for example, would be pronounced , differently from either of the words above. In 2014, a study recording the electrical activity of the brain showed that native Japanese speakers mainly use context, rather than pitch accent information, to contrast between words that differ only in pitch.

This property of the Japanese language allows for a certain type of pun, called , combining two words with the same or very similar sounds but different pitch accents and thus meanings. For example, kaeru-ga kaeru  .

Since any syllable, or none, may be accented, Tokyo-type dialects have N+1 possibilities, where N is the number of syllables (not morae) in a word, though this pattern only holds for a relatively small N.

Other dialects 

Accent and tone are the most variable aspect of Japanese dialects. Some have no accent at all; of those that do, it may occur in addition to a high or low word tone.

The dialects that have a Tokyo-type accent, like the standard Tokyo dialect described above, are distributed over Hokkaido, northern Tohoku, most of Kanto, most of Chūbu, Chūgoku and northeastern Kyushu. Most of these dialects have a more-or-less high tone in unaccented words (though first mora has low tone, and following morae have high tone); an accent takes the form of a downstep, after which the tone stays low. But some dialects, for example, dialects of northern Tohoku and eastern Tottori, typically have a more-or-less low tone in unaccented words; accented syllables have a high tone, with low tone on either side, rather like English stress accent. In any case, the downstep has phonological meaning and the syllable followed by downstep is said to be "accented".

Keihan (Kyoto–Osaka)-type dialects of Kansai and Shikoku have nouns with both patterns: That is, they have tone differences in unaccented as well as accented words, and both downstep in some high-tone words and a high-tone accent in some low-tone words. In the neighboring areas of Tokyo-type and Keihan-type such as parts of Kyushu, northeastern Kanto, southern Tohoku, around Fukui, around Ōzu in Ehime and elsewhere, nouns are not accented at all.

Kyushu (two-pattern type)

In western and southern Kyushu dialects (pink area on the map on the right), a high tone falls on a predictable syllable, depending only on whether the noun has an accent. This is termed a two-pattern (nikei) system, as there are two possibilities, accented and not accented. For instance, in the Kagoshima dialect unaccented nouns have a low tone until the final syllable, at which point the pitch rises. In accented nouns, however, the penultimate syllable of a phonological word has a high tone, which drops on the final syllable. (Kagoshima phonology is based on syllables, not on morae.) For example, irogami 'colored paper' is unaccented in Kagoshima, while kagaribi 'bonfire' is accented. The ultimate or penultimate high tone will shift when any unaccented grammatical particle is added, such as nominative -ga or ablative -kara: 

In the Shuri dialect of the Okinawan language, unaccented words are high tone; accent takes the form of a downstep after the second syllable, or after the first syllable of a disyllabic noun. However, the accents patterns of the Ryukyuan languages are varied, and do not all fit the Japanese patterns.

Nikei accents are also found in parts of Fukui and Kaga in Hokuriku region (green area on map).

No accent versus one-pattern type
In Miyakonojō, Miyazaki (small black area on map), there is a single accent: all phonological words have a low tone until the final syllable, at which point the pitch rises. That is, every word has the pitch pattern of Kagoshima . Phonologically, it is the same as the absence of an accent (white areas on map), and is sometimes counted as such, as there can be no contrast between words based on accent. However, speakers of -type dialects feel that they are accenting a particular syllable, whereas speakers of unaccented dialects have no such intuition.

Keihan (Kyoto–Osaka type)

Near the old capital of Kyoto, in Kansai, Shikoku, and parts of Hokuriku (the easternmost Western Japanese dialects), there is a more innovative system, structurally similar to a combination of these patterns. There are both high and low initial tone as well as the possibility of an accented mora. That is, unaccented nouns may have either a high or a low tone, and accented words have pitch accent in addition to this word tone. This system will be illustrated with the Kansai dialect of Osaka.

Accented high-tone words in Osaka, like atama 'head', are structurally similar to accented words in Tokyo, except that the pitch is uniformly high prior to the downstep, rather than rising as in Tokyo. As in Tokyo, the subsequent morae have low pitch. Unaccented high-tone words, such as sakura 'cherry tree', are pronounced with a high tone on every syllable, and in following unaccented particles:

High tone , accent on ta: 
High tone , no accent: 

Low-tone accented words are pronounced with a low pitch on every mora but the accented one. They are like accented words in Kagoshima, except that again there are many exceptions to the default placement of the accent. For example, tokage is accented on the ka in both Osaka and Kagoshima, but omonaga 'oval face' is accented on mo in Osaka and na in Kagoshima (the default position for both dialects); also, in Osaka the accented is fixed on the mo, whereas in Kagoshima it shifts when particles are added. Unaccented low-tone words such as usagi 'rabbit' have high pitch only in the final mora, just as in Kagoshima:

Low tone , accent on mo: 
Low tone , no accent: 

Hokuriku dialect in Suzu is similar, but unaccented low-tone words are purely low, without the rise at the end: 
: ;
sakura has the same pattern as in Osaka.

In Kōchi, low-tone words have low pitch only on the first mora, and subsequent morae are high: 
: .

The Keihan system is sometimes described as having 2n+1 possibilities, where n is the number of morae (up to a relatively small number), though not all of these actually occur. From the above table, there are three accent patterns for one-mora words, four (out of a theoretical 2n+1 = 5) for two-mora words, and six (out of a theoretical 2n+1 = 7) for three-mora words.

Correspondences between dialects
There are regular correspondences between Tokyo-type and Keihan-type accents. The downstep on high-tone words in conservative Keihan accents generally occurs one syllable earlier than in the older Tokyo-type accent. If a word is unaccented and high-tone in Keihan dialects, it is also unaccented in Tokyo-type dialects. If a two-mora word has a low tone in Keihan dialects, it has a downstep on the first mora in Tokyo-type dialects.

In Tokyo, whereas most non-compound native nouns have no accent, most verbs (including adjectives) do. Moreover, the accent is always on the penultimate mora, that is, the last mora of the verb stem, as in  'be white' and  'get up'. In Kansai, however, verbs have high- and low-tone paradigms as nouns do. High-tone verbs are either unaccented or are accented on the penultimate mora, as in Tokyo. Low-tone verbs are either unaccented or accented on the final syllable, triggering a low tone on unaccented suffixes. In Kyoto, verbal tone varies irregularly with inflection, a situation not found in more conservative dialects, even more conservative Kansai-type dialects such as that of Kōchi in Shikoku.

Syllabic and moraic

Japanese pitch accent also varies in how it interacts with syllables and morae. Kagoshima is a purely syllabic dialect, while Osaka is moraic. In Tokyo, accent placement is constrained by the syllable, though the downstep occurs between the morae of that syllable. That is, a stressed syllable in Tokyo dialect, as in  kai 'shell' or  san 'divining rod', will always have the pattern , never .

References

Bibliography

External links

 Japanese word accent speech analysis
 Formulation of Japanese pitch accent

Pitch accent
Tone (linguistics)